The AWZ P70 "Zwickau" is a small family car which was produced in East Germany by VEB Automobilwerke Zwickau (AWZ) between 1955 and 1959.

It succeeded the IFA F8 using the same 684 cc two-cylinder, two-stroke engine but with a completely new Duroplast body on a wooden frame and plywood floor. The engine produced .

The saloon was introduced in 1955, followed by an estate version in 1956 and a coupé in 1957. After the Chevrolet Corvette (C1), the P70 was one of the first cars to be built using an all plastic body.

In 1958 AWZ was united with the former Horch factory to become the VEB Sachsenring Automobilwerke Zwickau and the AWZ P70 became the Sachsenring P70.

The P70 was replaced by the Trabant P 50 in 1959 after 36,151 examples had been produced.

References

P70
Cars introduced in 1956